Mishen (also Romanized as Mīshen and Mīshan; also known as Bīshen, Bīshīn, and Mīshīn) is a village in Kamazan-e Olya Rural District, Zand District, Malayer County, Hamadan Province, Iran. At the 2006 census, its population was 1,066, in 260 families.

References 

Populated places in Malayer County